Za Bakdaz: The Unfinished Opera is a collection of songs German countertenor Klaus Nomi was working on up until his death in 1983. The album was released posthumously in 2007. The large majority of the tracks have never before been heard on an official studio release; the original sessions took place from 1979 to 1983, with the tracks completed between 1984 and 2006 at the home studio of Page Wood and George Elliott. Some of those involved with the project have said that the album was nowhere near completed at the time of Klaus' passing.

Track listing
"High Wire" – 2:04
"Valentine's Day" – 2:49
"Enchanté" – 4:31
"Overture" – 2:42
"Cre Spoda" – 3:03
"Metronomi" – 2:44
"Intermezzzo" – 1:16
"Za Bakdaz" (live) – 3:09
"Perna-A-Gyre" – 2:56
"Finale" – 2:33
"Rubber Band Lazer" (demo)  – 2:21
"Silent Night" – 1:38

References

2007 albums
Klaus Nomi albums
Albums published posthumously
New wave albums by German artists
Opera recordings
Electronic albums by German artists
Sound collage albums